Thomas Hamilton Osborne (c.1806 – 28 May 1853) was a journalist and politician in colonial Victoria (Australia).

Osborne studied Natural Philosophy, Belfast. 
Mercer was elected  to the district of Belfast and Warrnambool in the inaugural Victorian Legislative Council in  October 1851.

Osborne resigned from the Council in December 1852. He was editor and proprietor of the Belfast Gazette.

References 

 

1806 births
1853 deaths
Members of the Victorian Legislative Council
Burials in Victoria (Australia)
19th-century Australian politicians